Not All Who Wander Are Lost is the third solo album by American virtuoso mandolinist Chris Thile.  It was released on Sugar Hill in 2001.

The record builds on his previous work in that it is largely bluegrass and newgrass inspired. Although Not All Who Wander Are Lost was Thile's third solo album, it is widely considered his first major one, primarily based on the fact that Nickel Creek's initial success came in 2000 with their platinum debut album.

The picture on the cover of the album was taken in June 2001 in San Francisco before a Nickel Creek show at the Great American Music Hall.

Etymology 
The album's title is taken from a poem in J. R. R. Tolkien's The Fellowship of the Ring, The Riddle of Strider.

The title of the song "Riddles in the Dark" is also rooted in the works of Tolkien. It is the title of the chapter in The Hobbit where Bilbo and Gollum compete in a contest of riddles.

The title of the song "Club G.R.O.S.S." comes from the Calvin & Hobbes comic strip. The club was started by Calvin and his stuffed tiger, and stands for "Get Rid of Slimy GirlS."

Track listing

Personnel

Musical 
 Chris Thile - mandolin, producer, mixing
 Jeff Coffin - tenor saxophone
 Jerry Douglas - dobro
 Stuart Duncan - fiddle
 Béla Fleck - banjo
 Byron House - bass, guitar
 Edgar Meyer - bass
 Bryan Sutton - guitar
 Sara Watkins - fiddle
 Sean Watkins - guitar

Technical 
 Jenny Anne Bulla - Photography
 Robert Hadley - Mastering
 Brent Hedgecock - Photography
 Scott Thile - Photography
 Gary Paczosa - Engineer, Mixing
 Doug Sax - Mastering

References 

Chris Thile albums
2001 albums
Sugar Hill Records albums